Burhanuddin Gharib (d. 1344) was an Indian Sufi of the Chishti Order.

Life
Burhanuddin Gharib studied under Nizamuddin Auliya, the Sultan ul Mashaikh of Delhi. According to Saiad Mahomed of Karmania in the "Seyar ul Aulia," Burhanuddin was invested with the mantle and cap (the symbols of the Caliphate) to identify him as the successor to the Auliya. According to other writers[whom?], Burhanuddin was sent to Daulatabad to succeed his brother, Shah Muntajab ud din, upon his death. It is probable that Burhanuddin first succeeded Auliya as Caliph. He would arrive in Daulatabad later, after Sultan Muhammad bin Tughluq transferred the capital there from Delhi.

Haji Saiad Baksh and Shams ud Din, the nephew of Hasan bin Es Sanjari, were friends of Burhanuddin. Burhanuddin allowed music and rejoicing in the religious exercises at his convent. He remained for some time at Daulatabad. He later left for Roza (present-day Khuldabad), where he would die in 741 AH (1344 CE).

Legacy 
When the sovereign Nasir ud din Nasir Khan Faruki of the Faruki dynasty of Kandesh captured Asirgarh in 1399 CE, the town of Burhanpur on the bank of Tapti was founded in honor of Burhanuddin.

The dargah has a large quadrangular courtyard, featuring an open-fronted building on all sides and a Naqqar khana at the east end. The west end of the quadrangle is used as a school, and a door gives access to an inner courtyard containing several graves. Facing the entrance is the tomb of Burhanuddin. Within the shrine are preserved some hairs of the Prophet's beard. The shrine doors are plated with metal plates wrought into fanciful designs of trees and flowers. There is a mosque in front of the dargah. The dargah attracts thousands of pilgrims each year for the Urus of the saint.

Nizam-ul-Mulk Asaf Jah's tomb
To the right of Burhanuddin's tomb are the resting places of Nizam-ul-Mulk Asaf Jah I, the founder of the Hyderabad dynasty, his second son Nasir Jang, and one of his consorts. They are covered with a white cloth. The graves are on a platform of porphyry inlaid with white marble. A ten-foot high screen of red porphyry surrounds them. Nasir Jang's tomb is on the left. It is surrounded by small, scalloped arches of red porphyry.

Further reading 

 Bakiat-el-Gharib by Mujud ud Din

See also
 Nizams of Hyderabad
 Ganj Rawan Ganj Baksh
 Khuldabad
 Zainuddin Shirazi
 Sufi Saints of Aurangabad
 Zar Zari Zar Baksh
 Ashraf Jahangir Semnani

References

 Gazetter of Aurangabad - H. H. The Nizam's Government 1884. (Chapter VI page 395 & 396)

External links
 aulia-e-hind

People from Aurangabad, Maharashtra
Chishtis
Indian Sufi saints